The Women's 400 metres T13 event at the 2012 Summer Paralympics took place at the London Olympic Stadium on 3 September. The event consisted of a single race.

Records
Prior to the competition, the existing World and Paralympic records were as follows:

Results

Competed 3 September 2012 at 19:00.

 
Q = qualified by place. q = qualified by time. PR = Paralympic Record. PB = Personal Best. SB = Seasonal Best. DNF = Did not finish. DNS = Did not start.

References

Athletics at the 2012 Summer Paralympics
2012 in women's athletics
Women's sport in London